The 1962 Davis Cup was the 51st edition of the Davis Cup, the most important tournament between national teams in men's tennis. 28 teams entered the Europe Zone, 8 teams entered the Eastern Zone, and 5 teams entered the America Zone. Iran and the Soviet Union made their first appearances in the tournament.

Mexico defeated Yugoslavia in the America Zone final, India defeated the Philippines in the Eastern Zone final, and Sweden defeated Italy in the Europe Zone final. In the Inter-Zonal Zone, Mexico defeated Sweden in the semifinal, and then defeated India in the final. Mexico were then defeated by the defending champions Australia in the Challenge Round. The final was played at the Milton Courts in Brisbane, Australia on 26–28 December. It was Mexico's first appearance in a Davis Cup final.

America Zone

Draw

Final
Mexico vs. Yugoslavia

Eastern Zone

Draw

Final
India vs. Philippines

Europe Zone

Draw

Final
Sweden vs. Italy

Inter-Zonal Zone

Draw

Semifinals
Mexico vs. Sweden

Final
India vs. Mexico

Challenge Round
Australia vs. Mexico

References

External links
Davis Cup Official Website

 
Davis Cups by year
Davis Cup
Davis Cup
Davis Cup
Davis Cup
Davis Cup